Dark Tower may refer to:

Literature
 The Dark Tower (series), a fantasy series created by Stephen King
The Dark Tower VII: The Dark Tower (2004), the seventh novel in the series
 The Dark Tower (comics)
 The Dark Tower (Lewis novel), an unfinished novel attributed to C. S. Lewis
 Barad-dûr or the Dark Tower, the fortress of Sauron in J. R. R. Tolkien's The Lord of the Rings

Film and television
 The Dark Tower (1943 film), a circus film starring Herbert Lom
 Dark Tower (1987 film), a horror film starring Jenny Agutter
 The Dark Tower (2017 film), based on the Stephen King novels above
 "The Dark Tower", an episode of Revolution

Plays
 The Dark Tower (play), a 1933 comedy by George S. Kaufman and Alexander Woollcott
 The Dark Tower, a 1946 radio play by Louis MacNeice

Gaming
 Dark Tower (game), a 1981 electronic board game
 Return to Dark Tower (2021), the sequel to Dark Tower
 Dark Tower (module), a 1980 adventure module for Advanced Dungeons & Dragons

Movement and Space
 Dark Tower (Movement and Space) , a cultural movement supported by a residential / business estate commissioned by Madame C.J. Walker

Other uses
 The Dark Tower (album), a 2011 album by Nox Arcana
 Almoayyed Tower or Dark Tower, a building in Manama, Bahrain

See also
 "Childe Roland to the Dark Tower Came", an 1855 poem by Robert Browning that inspired the Stephen King series above.